Jalen Romande Green (born February 9, 2002) is an American professional basketball player for the Houston Rockets of the National Basketball Association (NBA). He was a consensus five-star recruit and the best shooting guard in the 2020 class, with ESPN ranking him number one overall. He finished his high school career at Prolific Prep in Napa, California, and he chose to forgo college basketball to join the NBA G League Ignite team in its inaugural season. Green has won three gold medals with the United States at the junior level and was named Most Valuable Player (MVP) of the 2018 FIBA Under-17 World Cup. Green was selected by the Houston Rockets with the second overall pick in the 2021 NBA draft. He is the third player in the NBA of Filipino descent, following Jordan Clarkson and Raymond Townsend.

Early life
Green was born in Merced, California. He grew up in Livingston, California. When Green was in third grade, he moved with his family back to Fresno, California. By sixth grade, he was playing Amateur Athletic Union basketball and practicing for five hours each day.

High school career
For his first three years of high school, Green played basketball for San Joaquin Memorial High School in Fresno. As a freshman, he was a full-time starter and averaged 18.1 points and nine rebounds per game. He led his team to a CIF Central Section Division II runner-up finish and the CIF Division II quarterfinals. He earned MaxPreps Freshman All-American second team and CIF Central Section rookie of the year honors. In his sophomore season, Green averaged 27.9 points and 7.7 rebounds per game, leading San Joaquin Memorial to a Central Section Division II title and the CIF Open Division playoffs. He was named MaxPreps National Sophomore of the Year and made the USA Today All-USA California second team.

As a junior, Green averaged 30.1 points, 7.8 rebounds, and 3.6 assists per game for San Joaquin Memorial. He won his second consecutive Central Division II championship. In the title game, Green surpassed the school career scoring record of 2,288 held by Roscoe Pondexter since 1971. He also helped his team reach the CIF Northern California Division I quarterfinals. Green was named USA Today All-USA California player of the year and appeared on the All-USA second team and MaxPreps All-American second team.
For his senior season, he transferred to Prolific Prep in Napa, California. He helped his team win the Grind Session World championship. In March 2020, he shared Grind Session most valuable player honors with Daishen Nix. Green averaged 31.5 points, 7.5 rebounds, and five assists per game, leading his team to a 31–3 record. He was named Sports Illustrated All-American player of the year and to the MaxPreps All-American first team. Green was selected to play in the McDonald's All-American Game, the Jordan Brand Classic, and the Nike Hoop Summit, but all three games were canceled due to the COVID-19 pandemic.

Recruiting
Green was a consensus five-star recruit and the number one shooting guard in the 2020 recruiting class, according to major recruiting services 247Sports, ESPN and Rivals. He was ranked as the top recruit in his class by ESPN. He received offers from many NCAA Division I basketball programs, including Arizona, Florida State, and USC before turning 15 years old. On April 16, 2020, Green announced that he would join the NBA G League, forgoing college basketball. He chose the G League over offers from Auburn, Oregon, and Memphis.

Professional career

NBA G League Ignite (2020–2021)
On April 16, 2020, Green signed a one-year, $600,000 contract with the NBA G League Ignite, a developmental team affiliated with the NBA G League. He became the first player to join the team. On March 8, 2021, Green recorded a season-high 30 points, seven assists, and five rebounds in a 127–102 loss to the Raptors 905 in the first round of the playoffs. He averaged 17.9 points, 4.1 rebounds, and 2.8 assists per game.

Houston Rockets (2021–present)

2021–22 season: All-Rookie First Team 

On July 29, 2021, Green was selected by the Houston Rockets second overall in the 2021 NBA draft, making him the first ever player being drafted out from the G-League, followed by former Ignite teammates Jonathan Kuminga and Isaiah Todd. On August 8, he made his summer league debut in a 84–76 win against the Cleveland Cavaliers where he posted 23 points, five rebounds, and two assists in 30 minutes. He made the All-Summer League Second Team after missing the last three of five games due to soreness on his right hamstring. He made his preseason debut on October 5 in a 125–119 win against the Washington Wizards with 12 points, six rebounds, and two assists. On October 20, Green made his NBA debut, putting up nine points, four rebounds, and four assists in a 124–106 loss to the Minnesota Timberwolves. On October 24, Green put up 30 points, with eight three-pointers made, in a 107–97 loss to the Boston Celtics, becoming the first rookie to put up at least 30 points and eight threes in a game in Rockets history. On October 28, Green and Jordan Clarkson became the first two players of Filipino descent to play in the same NBA game in time for the Rockets' Filipino Heritage Night celebration. Unfortunately for Green, he started out his rookie season suffering with a hamstring injury on his lower left leg after a home game win against the Chicago Bulls and been sidelined out of the rotation for a while. After missing 14-games in a month from his hamstring injury, Green returned to the starting line up on December 24, scoring 20 points by going on a 6-for-9 from the three point line in a loss road trip game to the Indiana Pacers.

On February 19, 2022, Green participated in the Slam Dunk Contest, finishing in third place. On March 9, Green scored 32 points along with three rebounds, three assists, and one blocked shot in 38 minutes which marked his second 30-point game in a 130–139 overtime win against the Los Angeles Lakers. On March 28, Green scored his third 30-points game along with four rebounds and assists in a 123–120 loss against the San Antonio Spurs. He joined with Allen Iverson as the only NBA rookie to score a 30-plus point in five straight games in a row since 1997. In his final game as a rookie, Green scored a then-career high with 41 points in a 130–114 loss to the Atlanta Hawks, which was the first 40-point game by a Rockets rookie since Hakeem Olajuwon. At the end of the regular season, he was named Rookie of the Month for March and April. He was selected to the NBA All-Rookie First Team with averages of 17.3 points, 3.4 rebounds, and 2.6 assists.

2022–23 season 
Prior to the 2022–23 season, Green changed his jersey number from 0 to 4. Green was unable to wear number 4 during his rookie season since Danuel House, who was still a teammate with Green, refused to exchange number jerseys with him since the number was a significance to him before being waived by the Rockets on December 17, 2021. In his second game of the season, Green played 35 minutes with a record of 33 points with four threes, five rebounds, two assists, and a steal in a 129–122 loss to the Grizzlies. On November 7, 2022, scored 34 points in a win against the Orlando Magic, making him the sixth guard in NBA history to score at least 30 points ten or more times before turning 21, joining other elite guards in Luka Dončić, Devin Booker, Anthony Edwards, LaMelo Ball, and Kyrie Irving. On November 26, he secured a career-high nine assists along with 28 points and three rebounds in a 118–105 win against the Oklahoma City Thunder. In December 2, Green logged 20 points in the third quarter leading with 30 points in a 122–121 comeback game win against the Phoenix Suns.

On January 15, 2023, the NBA suspended Green alongside with teammate Jae'Sean Tate for one game without pay for leaving the bench area during an altercation between the Rockets and the Sacramento Kings two days earlier. On January 18, Green tied a then-career high of 41 points with seven assists and five rebounds in a 121–117 loss against the Charlotte Hornets. On January 23, he surpassed his career high with 42 points along with four rebounds and four assists in a 119–114 win against the Minnesota Timberwolves. He became the only sixth player at 20 or younger to have recorded at least three 40-point games. On February 8, Green scored 41 points along with two assists and rebounds, securing his fourth game of 40 or more points before turning 21, tied for the third most in NBA history. He achieved this a day before his 21st birthday. On March 19, In a home game loss against the New Orleans Pelicans, Green scored 40 points, where he became the twelfth youngest player to scored around 40-points at age 21 or younger. He became the fourth youngest player to score 40-points in five games before turning 22 alongside with Tracy McGrady, Allen Iverson, and Carmelo Anthony.

National team career

Green represents the United States internationally but has also shown interest in playing for the Philippines in the future due to his partial Filipino background. He made his national team debut for the United States at the 2017 FIBA Under-16 Americas Championship in Formosa, Argentina. In five games, he averaged 9.8 points, two rebounds, and one steal per game, helping his team win the gold medal. He was named MVP of the 2018 FIBA Under-17 Basketball World Cup in Argentina after averaging a team-high 15.7 points, 2.3 rebounds, and 1.7 assists per game and winning the gold medal. Green won another gold medal with the United States at the 2019 FIBA Under-19 Basketball World Cup in Heraklion, Greece. As the youngest member of his team, he averaged 10.1 points, 2.1 rebounds, and 1.7 steals per game.

Player profile 
He is known for his elite athleticism, handling skills, and versatile scoring abilities that makes him an on-and off-the-ball threat in a half-court setting and in transition. He has drawn comparisons to Zach LaVine, Ray Allen, Kelly Oubre Jr., Bradley Beal, Clyde Drexler, and Kobe Bryant. Green utilizes an "explosive" first step that allows him to attack the rim and speed past on-ball defenders.

Scouts have noted that though his efficiency was "solid" in the NBA G League, he can be a consistent mercurial shooter. His defense, passing abilities, and small frame at 178 pounds have also been noted by scouts.

Career statistics

NBA

Regular season

|-
| style="text-align:left;"|
| style="text-align:left;"| Houston
| 67 || 67 || 31.9 || .426 || .343 || .797 || 3.4 || 2.6 || .7 || .3 || 17.3

Personal life
Green's mother, Bree Puruganan, is of partial Filipino descent through her grandfather. His step-father, Marcus Green, was a basketball teammate of NBA player DeShawn Stevenson at Washington Union High School in Fresno. He has a younger sister.

References

External links
NBA G League profile
USA Basketball bio

2002 births
Living people
21st-century African-American sportspeople
African-American basketball players
American men's basketball players
American sportspeople of Filipino descent
Basketball players from California
American people of Ilocano descent
Houston Rockets draft picks
Houston Rockets players
McDonald's High School All-Americans
NBA G League Ignite players
People from Merced, California
Shooting guards